The copper-tailed hummingbird (Saucerottia cupreicauda) is a species of hummingbird in the "emeralds", tribe Trochilini of subfamily Trochilinae. It is found in Brazil, Guyana, Suriname, Venezuela, and as a vagrant in French Guiana.

Taxonomy and systematics

The copper-tailed hummingbird was formerly placed in the genus Amazilia. A molecular phylogenetic study published in 2014 found that the genus Amazilia was polyphyletic. In the revised classification to create monophyletic genera, the  copper-tailed hummingbird was moved by most taxonomic systems to the resurrected genus Saucerottia.

The copper-tailed hummingbird's four subspecies were previously considered subspecies of the green-bellied hummingbird (S. viridigaster). By early 2023 most taxonomic systems had created the copper-tailed hummingbird (S. cupreicauda) containing four of them. However, the South American Classification Committee of the American Ornithological Society does not recognize the copper-tailed hummingbird as a separate species.

The four subspecies are:

S. v. duidae Chapman, 1929
S. v. cupreicauda (Salvin & Godman, 1884)
S. v. laireti (Phelps, WH Jr & Aveledo, 1988)
S. v. pacaraimae Weller, 2000

Description

Both sexes of all subspecies have a straight, medium length, blackish bill with a pink to reddish base to the mandible. Males of the nominate subspecies S. v. cupreicauda have crown, nape, and upper back of golden-green to bronze-green that goes through coppery green to the dark cinnamon rump and uppertail coverts. The inner four pairs of tail feathers are dark cinnamon with dark iridescent bronze-purple tips and the outermost pair cinnamon with reddish bronze to rufous tips. their forehead, face, chin, throat, and breast are emerald green, their lower belly and vent grayish brown, and their undertail coverts pale cinnamon. Nominate females are like the male with the addition of white bases to the chin feathers and bronze rather than rufous tips to the outermost tail feathers.

Subspecies S. v. duidaes lower back and rump are more coppery than the nominate's and its tail is rich bronze, with no rufous or cinnamon. Subspecies S. v. laireti is similar to the nominate but is slightly darker green. Its uppertail coverts and tail are golden-bronze to copper. Subspecies S. v. pacaraimae is also darker than the nominate and its back has a stronger copper wash. Its rump and uppertail coverts have a purple sheen, and like laireti no rufous or cinnamon on the tail.

Distribution and habitat

The subspecies of green-bellied hummingbird are found thus:

S. v. duidae, Cerro Duida in southern Venezuela
S. v. cupreicauda, tepuis where southeastern Venezuela, western Guyana, and extreme northern Brazil meet
S. v. laireti, tepuis of Sierra de Unturán and Cerro de la Neblina in southern Venezuela
S. v. pacaraimae, Sierra de Pacaraima in southern Venezuela

The South American Classification Committee of the American Ornithological Society includes Suriname in the range of S. v. cupreicauda and also notes its occurrence as a vagrant in French Guiana.

The copper-tailed hummingbird inhabits a variety of semi-open to open subtropical landscapes including the edges of gallery forest, plantations, scrub- and brushlands, river islands, and low secondary forest.

Behavior

Movement

The copper-tailed hummingbird is basically sedentary, but the nominate subspecies is known to make erratic seasonal movements.

Feeding

The copper-tailied hummingbird's foraging strategy and details of its diet are not well documented. Though its nectar sources have not been studied, it has been photographed feeding at plants of many different families. In addition to necatar it feeds on small arthropods.

Breeding

The copper-tailed hummingbird's breeding season appaears to include at least January to May. The only fully described nest is of S. v. cupreicauda. The clutch size, incubation period, and time to fledging are not known.

Vocalization

The copper-tailed hummingbird's song has been variously described as " a short dainty phrase which is repeated several times...tee-djee-tee-djee or tee-tee-djee-ti". Calls include a "short buzzy note...tzit..tzit..tzit..." and a "stuttered series of a few short high-pitched notes tsi-tsi-tsi-tsi" on the same pitch.

Status

The IUCN has assessed the copper-tailed hummingbird as being of Least Concern, though its population size is not known and is believed to be decreasing due to habitat destruction. No specific threats have been identified. It is "generally described as fairly common to uncommon, but most populations are fairly isolated." Most of the subspecies occur in at least one protected area. "Although no specific data have been published on the effects of anthropogenic habitat modification, the Copper-tailed Hummingbird appears to persist in fairly disturbed areas."

References

copper-tailed hummingbird
Hummingbird species of South America
Birds of the Tepuis
copper-tailed hummingbird
Taxonomy articles created by Polbot